Osa is a small village in the municipality of Ulvik in Vestland county, Norway. The village sits at the confluence of the two rivers: Austdøla and Norddøla, which then join together for about  before emptying into the fjord. Historically, this place was the connection between the Hardanger district and Hallingskeid (up on the Hardangervidda plateau.

References

Ulvik
Villages in Vestland